The Samoa women's national rugby union team is a national sporting side of Samoa, representing the nation at rugby union. The side first played in 2000.

History 
Samoa has attended three World Cups, namely the 2002, 2006 and 2014 Rugby World Cups.

Samoa won the 2019 Asia Pacific Championship in Fiji. In 2021, they were scheduled to play two test matches against Australia in July but the matches were canceled due to the COVID-19 pandemic. Samoa and Hong Kong both withdrew from the Final Qualification Tournament in Dubai due to travel restrictions caused by COVID-19.

Record

Rugby World Cup

Overall

Players

Previous squads

Coaches

References

External links

 Samoan rugby union news from Planet Rugby
 Pacific Islanders Rugby Team Supporters Site
 The information website for supporters of the Manu Samoa Rugby Team
 World Cup 2007 Preview
 Manu Samoa -  World Cup 2007

Women's national rugby union teams
Oceanian national women's rugby union teams
W
Rugby union